Waterside railway station served the village of Waterside, East Ayrshire, Scotland, from 1856 to 1964 on the Ayr and Dalmellington Railway.

History 
The station was opened on 7 August 1856 by the Glasgow and South Western Railway. To the south was the goods yard and at the south end of the platform was the signal box, which opened in 1893. To the north was a siding which served Dalmellington Iron Works to the northwest. It closed in 1921 but the private railway continued to keep the site in operation. The station closed on 6 April 1964.

References 

Disused railway stations in East Ayrshire
Railway stations in Great Britain opened in 1856
Railway stations in Great Britain closed in 1964
Beeching closures in Scotland
Former Glasgow and South Western Railway stations